UCLA Health Training Center is an indoor arena and basketball practice facility located in El Segundo, California. It hosts the South Bay Lakers of the NBA G League. The facility also serves as the training center for the Los Angeles Lakers of the National Basketball Association (NBA). It has a seating capacity of 750 spectators.

On August 31, 2016, it was announced that UCLA Health had signed a five-year naming rights deal with the Los Angeles Lakers. The deal stipulates an option to extend in five-year increments.

This arena is currently the smallest venue in the NBA G League.

References

External links
 

Basketball venues in California
Indoor arenas in California
Los Angeles Lakers venues
NBA G League venues
South Bay Lakers
Sports venues completed in 2017
2017 establishments in California
UCLA Health